Jindo Island is the third largest island in South Korea. Together with a group of much smaller islands, it forms Jindo County.

It is located in South Jeolla province, just off the southwest corner of the Korean peninsula. The island is separated from the mainland by the Myeongnyang Strait; however, this strait is now spanned by South Korea's longest cable-stayed bridge spanning 484 meters. Here in 1597 admiral Yi Sun-sin won the Battle of Myeongnyang, defeating a vastly superior Japanese fleet.

The Korea Jindo Dog is native to Jindo Island.

Every year, on a variable day in the spring or summer, a narrow land pass (about 2.9 km long and up to 40 meters wide) opens for about an hour between the main Jindo Island and small Modo island as a result of tidal activity. This event attracts hundreds of thousands of tourists and is accompanied by local festivals.

History

The island was known and inhabited since prehistoric time. In 995, it was called Haeyangdo, and later renamed to Okju county and became one of the 14 Korean states. In 1001, the island Okju was changed to Jindo. During the Mongol invasions of Korea of 1231–1270, the island served as a refuge for the Sambyeolcho Rebellion forces. However, in 1271, Mongols captured the island and removed all settlements from there. The population that returned after the Mongol invasion was constantly threatened by Japanese pirates invasions, and thus the island was nearly empty during the 14th century.

On 16 September 1597, during the Seven Year War, the Korean admiral Yi Sun-sin achieved a decisive victory in the Battle of Myeongnyang held at the Myeongnyang Strait. With 13 panokseons and about 200 men he defeated the Japanese fleet of 133 warships and 200 support ships. During the lifetime of Yi Sun-sin, the strait was also known as 'Uldolmok,' or 'the Roaring Channel,' most likely due to the powerful tidal forces in the channel, which were especially loud in spring.

Myeongnyang Strait
The Myeongnyang Strait (Hangul: 명량해협, Hanja: 鳴梁海峽, Revised Romanization: Myeongnyang Haehyeop, McCune–Reischauer: Myŏngnyang Haehyŏp; meaning screaming sea) separates Jindo Island and Jindo County from Haenam County on the mainland. At its narrowest point, the strait is about 300 meters wide and up to 22 meters deep, with the tide variations up to 6 meters in spring. The tidal currents reach up to 6 m/s and are considered as the fastest in Asia. Combined with a whirlpool in the strait, these fast tides hinder navigation. The area is frequently hit by typhoons with typical average wind speeds of 48 m/s. The coastline is very irregular and contains numerous minor valleys, mountains and islets. The shores are steep and are made by eroding igneous and volcanic rocks. There is significant navigation in the strait.

Jindo Bridge

A twin bridge, consisting of two cable-stayed bridges of very similar design, connect Jindo Island with the mainland, and its shape is reflected in the logo of the Jindo County. The first Jindo Bridge was opened on 18 October 1984. It has the main span of 344 m and two side spans of 70 m making the total length of 484 m at a width of only 11.7 m. At the time of its opening, it was the world's longest and narrowest suspension bridge. A 200-meter part under the bridge is open for major navigation for ships with ceiling below 20 meters. Increasing local traffic urged the government to add the second bridge in 2005, which has the same lengths, but is wider at 12.5 meters.

Activities

A medium-sized hunting dog breed called the Korean Jindo Dog (Hangul: 진돗개; Hanja: 珍島개) originates from the island. It is known in Korea for its fierce loyalty, attachment to home and hunting abilities. Since 1936, the dog is considered as a national cultural legacy and has been protected during the war times. There is a Jindo Dog Research and Testing Center on the island.

The tide-related sea level variations result in a land pass 2.9 km long and 10–40 meters wide opening for approximately an hour between the main Jindo island and the small Modo island to the south of Jindo. The event occurs about twice a year, around April–June. It had long been celebrated in a local festival called "Jindo's Sea Way", but was largely unknown to the world until 1975, when the French ambassador Pierre Randi described the phenomenon in a French newspaper. Nowadays, nearly half a million foreign and local tourists attend the event annually. It is accompanied by local festivals which include Ganggangsuwollae (Korean traditional circle dance), Ssitkim-gut (a shaman ritual, consoling the souls of the dead), Deul Norae (traditional farmers songs), Manga (burial ceremony songs), Jindo dog show, Buknori (drum performance) and fireworks.

The island has three art galleries, Sojun, Namjin and Sochi, containing collections of painters who worked here over the past centuries.

See also
Islands of South Korea
Geography of South Korea

References

External links 

 Satellite images of island and the "miracle road" (vague)

Jindo County
Islands of South Jeolla Province
Islands of the Yellow Sea